Kuzbu is an Akkadian word which means "seductive allure" or "sexual appeal."

Kuzbu may refer to:

 Beauty
 Eros (concept)
 Seduction
 Sex appeal